Johnny L. Ford (born August 23, 1942 in Midway, Alabama) is an American politician and mayor of Tuskegee, Alabama, and a former Alabama State Representative.

Early life and education
He was raised as a child and attended elementary school in Tuskegee. He is a graduate of Tuskegee Institute High School. Ford received his B.A. in History and Sociology from Knoxville College, his Master's of Public Administration from Auburn University Montgomery, and has received four Honorary Doctorate Degrees.

Personal life

Ford is Catholic, and married a White woman in a Roman Catholic ceremony at a time when miscegenation was still illegal in Alabama. They have three children: John, Christopher, and Tiffany.

Political career

Ford was first elected mayor of Tuskegee in 1972.  He was, along with Algernon J. Cooper of Prichard, elected the first black mayors of cities of more than 10,000 people in the modern era in Alabama in 1972 (although Hobson City had been black-run since its incorporation in 1899, but it was a smaller community).  After serving six terms as mayor, Ford was defeated in 1996 by Ronald D. Williams, a former political aide. Two years later in 1998, Ford ran for and won State Representative of the 82nd District from Macon County. He served from 1999 until 2004. In February 2003, he switched to the Republican Party, becoming Alabama's first black Republican in the state legislature in more than 100 years.

Preferring to serve in his old office as mayor, he resigned from the legislature and was elected mayor in 2004, defeating the first black woman mayor of Tuskegee, Lucenia Williams Dunn by a 54-46% margin. Facing a tough reelection to an 8th non-consecutive term in 2008, which featured 5 candidates, challenger Omar Neal led in the August municipal election by just 12 votes (927 to 915) over Ford. Credited with turning out the "youth vote" from Tuskegee University, Neal defeated Ford by a 54-46% margin (1,463 to 1,270), in a higher turnout October runoff. As of 2015, Tuskegee has not reelected a mayor to a consecutive term since Ford won his sixth term in 1992.

Ford is the founder and Director General of the World Conference of Mayors and also serves as President of Johnny Ford and Associates, Inc. Ford is the President-emeritus and Founder of the National Conference of Black Mayors.  He was appointed to the Presidential Advisory Committee on Federalism and the U.S. Intergovernmental Policy Advisory Committee on Trade. Ford is also a past President of the Alabama League of Municipalities, is a member of Kappa Alpha Psi, and the founding President of the Tuskegee Optimist Club.

Ford rejoined the Democratic party and ran for the open state Senate district 28 in 2010 (incumbent Myron Penn retired).  Though it is a majority-minority seat, he lost the run-off election to Billy Beasley, who is white, and the brother of former Lieutenant Governor Jere Beasley.

In 2012, Ford ran again for his old job as Tuskegee mayor and in the August primary, he defeated 1st term Mayor Neal by a margin of 57-38% (with 3rd candidate Lula Pearl-Franklin pulling the remaining 5%) and as a result, did not require a run-off. He was then sworn in to an unprecedented 8th non-consecutive term as mayor.

References

1942 births
Living people
Alabama Democrats
Alabama Republicans
Auburn University at Montgomery alumni
People from Midway, Alabama
Members of the Alabama House of Representatives
Mayors of places in Alabama
African-American mayors in Alabama
Knoxville College alumni
African-American state legislators in Alabama
African-American Catholics
21st-century African-American people
20th-century African-American people